Mohammad Fitri bin Saari (born 4 March 1993) is a Malaysian field hockey player. He is the younger brother of Malaysian field hockey player Faizal Saari.

In 2011, he made his debut with the senior national team in the inaugural Asian Champions Trophy. In the same year he won the Sultan of Johor Cup with the Project 2013 squad scoring a goal in the final against Australia.

References

External links
 

1993 births
Living people
Malaysian people of Malay descent
People from Kelantan
Malaysian male field hockey players
Male field hockey midfielders
Field hockey players at the 2014 Asian Games
2014 Men's Hockey World Cup players
Field hockey players at the 2018 Asian Games
2018 Men's Hockey World Cup players
Southeast Asian Games gold medalists for Malaysia
Southeast Asian Games medalists in field hockey
Asian Games silver medalists for Malaysia
Asian Games medalists in field hockey
Medalists at the 2018 Asian Games
Competitors at the 2017 Southeast Asian Games
21st-century Malaysian people